Althin Caleb, (20 February 1866 - 29 January 1919) was a Swedish painter, illustrator and art teacher.

Althin studied at the Royal Swedish Academy of Arts in Stockholm 1885–1894, with the exception of some years abroad studying decorative painting. He is perhaps best known as the founder of Althin's School of Painting (in Swedish: Althins målarskola) in 1896, where he was head teacher in freehand drawing. For several decades the school played an important role, not least by preparing young artists for the Academy of Arts. From 1912 he was also teacher in figure drawing at Konstfack in Stockholm.

Althin has made decorative works for Swedish churches; Sofia Church in Stockholm, Uppsala Cathedral and many other. He also made magazine illustrations and posters.

Gallery

References
Svensk uppslagsbok, Lund 1929 (in Swedish)

1866 births
1919 deaths
19th-century Swedish painters
Swedish male painters
20th-century Swedish painters
20th-century Swedish male artists
Swedish illustrators
People from Karlskrona
19th-century Swedish male artists